Barbès is the debut album by French–Algerian singer Rachid Taha. It was released by Barclay Records in 1990.

A video clip was made for the title track Barbès.

Track listing
All songs written and composed by Rachid Taha.

 "Confiance" – 5:40
 "Barbès" – 4:25
 "Gazelle" – 4:41
 "Lela" – 4:24
 "Je Le Sais (Je Le Sens)" with Cheba Noria – 3:30
 "Arab Rap" – 6:20
 "Lyeh" – 5:28
 "Bled" – 4:25
 "Enti Wa Ana" – 3:37
 "Partir" – 3:57
 "Arab Dub" – 6:30
 "Confiance Dub" – 5:40

Personnel
Lucien Athanase – keyboards
Nathalie Baylaucq – design
Christian Brun – guitars
Xavier Jouvelet – percussion
Nabil Ibn Khalidi – oud, banjo, bendio
Godwin Logie – production
Martial Macaugle – drums
Yovo M'Bouele – bass
Miloud – violin
Najette – background vocals
Cheba Noria – vocals
Jean-Pierre Rodella – photography
Rachid Taha – vocals

Source:

References

External links
Official website

1990 debut albums
Rachid Taha albums